Lewys Môn (fl. 1485 – 1527) was a Welsh-language poet, one of the Beirdd yr Uchelwyr (Poets of the Nobility), from the cwmwd (commote) of  on Ynys Môn, north Wales. About 110 of his poems survive, mostly traditional praise poems and elegies for members of the Welsh gentry, especially of north Wales.

His will was proved on 28 June 1527, and an elegy for him was written by Dafydd Alaw

References

Bibliography
Eurys Rowlands (ed.), Gwaith Lewys Môn (Cardiff, 1979). The standard edition of Lewys' poetry.

1520s deaths
16th-century Welsh poets
16th-century male writers
Lewys Mon
People from Anglesey
Year of birth unknown